The 1932 New Forest and Christchurch by-election was held on 9 February 1932. The by-election was held due to the elevation to the peerage of the incumbent Conservative MP, Wilfrid Ashley. It was won by the Conservative candidate John Mills.

References

New Forest and Christchurch by-election
New Forest District
New Forest and Christchurch by-election
New Forest and Christchurch by-election
By-elections to the Parliament of the United Kingdom in Hampshire constituencies
20th century in Hampshire